The 2000 VMI Keydets football team represented the Virginia Military Institute during the 2000 NCAA Division I-AA football season. It was the Keydets' 110th year of football and second season under head coach Cal McCombs.

The Keydets endured a 2–9 campaign, which included wins over Charleston Southern and a 41–21 victory over The Citadel in the Military Classic of the South.

Schedule

References

VMI
VMI Keydets football seasons
VMI Keydets football